Laminaribiose C12H22O11 is a disaccharide which is used notably in the agricultural field and as an antiseptic.  It is in general obtained by hydrolysis or by acetolysis of natural polysaccharides of plant origin. It is also a product of the caramelization of glucose.

References

Disaccharides